The Church Santa María del Rosario of Vega Baja (Spanish: Iglesia Santa María del Rosario de Vega Baja) is a historic Catholic parish church from 1860 located in the main public square (plaza) of Vega Baja Pueblo, the historic and cultural downtown of the municipality of Vega Baja, Puerto Rico. The parish, which is part of the Roman Catholic Diocese of Arecibo, was added to the United States National Register of Historic Places in 1984 as part of the Historic Churches of Puerto Rico thematic multiple property submission.

The church was designed by architect Antonio María Guitián and it was built in stages between the years 1850 and 1874, while being consecrated in 1860 and officially inaugurated on March 12, 1870. Its original clock tower was heavily damaged by the 1918 Aguadilla earthquake, and finally destroyed by the 1928 Okeechobee hurricane, better known as the San Felipe Segundo hurricane in Puerto Rico. In addition to its inscription in the National Register of Historic Places on September 18, 1984, the church was included in the municipally designated Historic Zone of Vega Baja in 2004.

The church is open to the public during weekday services at 6:30 AM and 7:00 PM, and during weekend services at 4:00 PM and 7:00 PM.

Gallery

References 

Vega Baja, Puerto Rico
19th-century Roman Catholic church buildings
Roman Catholic churches completed in 1874
Churches on the National Register of Historic Places in Puerto Rico
Tourist attractions in Puerto Rico
Roman Catholic churches in Puerto Rico
1870s establishments in Puerto Rico
1874 establishments in the Spanish Empire